Abdon Pamich (born 3 October 1933) is a former Italian race walker. He competed in the race walking event at the 1956, 1960, 1964, 1968, and 1972 Olympics and won a bronze medal in 1960 and a gold in 1964. Pamich was the Olympics flag bearer for Italy in 1972.

Biography

Pamich was born in Fiume (Rijeka, present-day Croatia) on 3 October 1933, at that time the city was under Italian jurisdiction. He left Rijeka for Italy, with his older brother, on 24 September 1947 and joined his father who had emigrated earlier.

On 16 October 1960 he set a world record over 50 km at 4:03:02 in Ponte San Pietro. Later he was inducted into the FIDAL Hall of Fame.

Achievements

European champion in 1961 and 1966 and gold at Mediterranean Games in 1958, 1963 and 1971.

National titles
Pamich won 40 national championships:
 13 in the 10 km walk (1956 and 12 times consecutively from 1958 to 1969)
 13 in the 20 km walk (12 times consecutively from 1958 to 1969 and 1971)
 14 in the 50 km walk (consecutively from 1955 to 1969)

See also
 Legends of Italian sport - Walk of Fame
 List of athletes with the most appearances at Olympic Games
 Italian Athletics Championships – Multi winners

References

External links
 
 

1933 births
Sportspeople from Rijeka
Living people
Italian male racewalkers
Olympic male racewalkers
Olympic athletes of Italy
Olympic gold medalists for Italy
Olympic bronze medalists for Italy
Olympic gold medalists in athletics (track and field)
Olympic bronze medalists in athletics (track and field)
Athletes (track and field) at the 1956 Summer Olympics
Athletes (track and field) at the 1960 Summer Olympics
Athletes (track and field) at the 1964 Summer Olympics
Athletes (track and field) at the 1968 Summer Olympics
Athletes (track and field) at the 1972 Summer Olympics
Medalists at the 1960 Summer Olympics
Medalists at the 1964 Summer Olympics
Mediterranean Games gold medalists for Italy
Mediterranean Games gold medalists in athletics
Athletes (track and field) at the 1955 Mediterranean Games
Athletes (track and field) at the 1963 Mediterranean Games
Athletes (track and field) at the 1971 Mediterranean Games
World Athletics Race Walking Team Championships winners
European Athletics Championships winners
Italian Athletics Championships winners
Japan Championships in Athletics winners
Italian people of Croatian descent